Collide may refer to:

 Collide (band), an American electro-industrial band
 Collide (The Gufs album), 1995
 Collide (Skillet album), 2003
 Collide (Andy Hunter album), 2010
 Collide (Boyz II Men album), 2014
 Collide, an album by Beats Antique
 "Collide" (Howie Day song), 2004
 "Collide" (Krystal Meyers song), 2006
 "Collide" (Leona Lewis and Avicii song), 2011
 "Collide" (Breathe Carolina song), 2014
 "Collide" (Justine Skye song), 2014
 "Collide" (Ed Sheeran song), 2021
 "Collide", Jars of Clay song from the 1999 album If I Left the Zoo
 "Collide", a Grammy-nominated song by artists EARTHGANG and Tiana Major9, from the Queen & Slim soundtrack, 2019
 Collide (2016 film), 2016 action film
 Collide (2022 film), 2022 film starring Ryan Phillippe

See also
 Collider (disambiguation)
 Collision (disambiguation)